Paulo Zanetti (born September 24, 1952) is a former international freestyle swimmer from Brazil, who competed at one Summer Olympics for his native country.

He was at the 1971 Pan American Games, in Cali, where he won a bronze medal in the 4×100-metre freestyle, breaking the South American record.

At the 1972 Summer Olympics, in Munich, he finished 4th in the 4×100-metre freestyle (6 seconds and a half below the South American record). He also swam the 100-metre freestyle and the 4×200-metre freestyle, not reaching the finals.

He was at the 1975 World Aquatics Championships in Cali. In the 4×200-metre freestyle, he finished 12th, with a time of 8:07.41, along with Paul Jouanneau, Eduardo Alijó Neto and Paulo Mangini.

He was at the 1975 Pan American Games, in Mexico City, where he finished 6th in the 100-metre freestyle.

References

1952 births
Living people
Swimmers at the 1971 Pan American Games
Swimmers at the 1972 Summer Olympics
Swimmers at the 1975 Pan American Games
Olympic swimmers of Brazil
Pan American Games bronze medalists for Brazil
Brazilian male freestyle swimmers
Pan American Games medalists in swimming
Medalists at the 1971 Pan American Games
20th-century Brazilian people
21st-century Brazilian people